The Dutch Coal Trade Union was a business cartel which operated in the Netherlands from 1893. Daniël George van Beuningen was one of the leading figures in the organisation. It represented the Rhenish-Westphalian Coal Syndicate in the Netherlands

References

1893 establishments in the Netherlands
Cartels